Dane Luke Pineau (born 2 August 1994) is an Australian professional basketball player who last played for the South East Melbourne Phoenix of the National Basketball League (NBL). He primarily plays as centre. He competed in U.S. college basketball for the Saint Mary's Gaels.

Early life
From May 2012 to June 2013, he was a basketball scholarship athlete at the Australian Institute of Sport in Canberra.

College career
Pineau joined Saint Mary's for the 2013–14 season. He started in all 35 games in his junior year. In his final season with Saint Marys, he helped them reach the second round of the NCAA Tournament and averaged 6.6 points and 6.1 rebounds while shooting an efficient 61 per cent.

Professional career
Pineau played for the Sydney Kings in the NBL between 2017 and 2019. He joined the South East Melbourne Phoenix for their inaugural season in 2019–20. He played his fourth season for the Phoenix in 2022–23.

In 2018, Pineau played for the Kilsyth Cobras in the SEABL.

National team career
Pineau competed for Australia in the 2013 FIBA Under-19 World Championship in Prague. He averaged 11.8 points, 9 rebounds, and 1.3 assists on the fourth-place team. His best game was a 21-point outing versus Serbia.

Personal life
Pineau is the son of Brad Pineau, who played in the NBL for Devonport Warriors and Melbourne Tigers.

References

External links
NBL profile
Saint Mary's Gaels college bio

1994 births
Living people
Australian expatriate basketball people in the United States
Australian Institute of Sport basketball players
Australian men's basketball players
Centers (basketball)
People educated at Melbourne Grammar School
Saint Mary's Gaels men's basketball players
South East Melbourne Phoenix players
Basketball players from Melbourne
Sydney Kings